Bintulu or Vaie is an Austronesian language of Borneo. Robert Blust leaves it as an isolate within the North Sarawakan languages. Ethnologue notes that it might be closest to Baram within those languages.

References

External links 
 Paradisec has an open access collection of Bintulu language recordings made by Robert Blust.
 Kaipuleohone also has archived materials of Bintulu.
 Vaie words in the Malay Wiktionary

North Sarawakan languages
Languages of Malaysia
Endangered Austronesian languages